Tony Lévy is an historian of mathematics, born in Egypt in 1943, specializing particularly in Hebrew mathematics.

His family left Egypt in 1957 for Belgium and France after the Suez Crisis but his elder brother Eddy Levy remained in Egypt. A political activist, the latter converted to Islam and took the name Adel Rifaat. He would join France in the 80s and form with Bahgat Elnadi the binomial of political scientists and scholars of Islam known under the pseudonym Mahmoud Hussein. His other brother is the activist, philosopher and writer Benny Levy. Like his younger brother Benny, Tony was an extreme left militant in the 1960s and 1970s.

Publications 
 L'Infini et le nombre chez Rabbi Hasdai Crescas : XVIe siècle, 1983
 Mathématiques de l'infini chez Hasdai Crescas (1340–1410) : un chapitre de l'histoire de l'infini d'Aristote à la Renaissance, 1985
 Figures de l'infini : les mathématiques au miroir des cultures, 1987
 Le Chapitre I, 73 du "Guide des égarés" et la tradition mathématique hébraïque au moyen âge : Un commentaire inédit de Salomon b. Isaac, 1989
 L'Étude des sections coniques dans la tradition médiévale hébraïque, ses relations avec les tradictions arabe et latine, 1989
 Éléments d'Euclide, 1991
 Gersonide, commentateur d'Euclide : traduction annotée de ses gloses sur les Eléments, 1992
 Gersonide, le Pseudo-Tusi, et le postulat des paralleles : Les mathématiques en hébreu et leurs sources arabes, 1992
 L'histoire des nombres amiables : le témoignage des textes hébreux médiévaux, 1996
 La littérature mathématique hébraïque en Europe du XIe au XVIe siècle, 1996
 La matematica hebraica, 2002
 A Newly-Discovered Partial Hebrew Version of al-Khārizmī's Algebra, 2002
 L'algèbre arabe dans les textes hébraïques (I) : un ouvrage inédit d'Isaac ben Salomon Al-Aḥdab (XVIe siècle), 2003
 Maïmonide philosophe et savant, 1138–1204, 2004 (in collaboration)
 Sefer ha-middot : a mid-twelfth-century text on arithmetic and geometry attributed to Abraham ibn Ezra, 2006 (in collaboration)
 L'algèbre arabe dans les textes hébraïques (II) : dans l'Italie des XVe et XVIe siècles : sources arabes et sources vernaculaires, 2007

External links 
 Maïmonide philosophe et savant (1138–1204)
 L'étude des sections coniques dans la tradition médiévale hébraïque. Ses relations avec les traditions arabe et latine
 L'ESPACE, LE LIEU, L'INFINI on YouTube

20th-century French mathematicians
21st-century French mathematicians
Historians of mathematics
French Maoists
1943 births
Living people